The EDRO III was a cargo ship, built in 1966 by Kaldnes Mekaniske Verksted at Tønsberg in Norway.

Paphos accident
The Sierra Leone-flagged EDRO III ran aground off Pegeia on 8 October 2011 in heavy seas, during a voyage to Rhodes, from Limassol, Cyprus with a cargo of plasterboard. At the time of the accident, the ship had nine crew members – seven Albanians and two Egyptians.  The crew were rescued and airlifted to the safety of Paphos by a local British Military helicopter.

The ship lies on the sea rocks at an angle of 11–12 degrees near the sea cave area. Together with Germany's CIMEXTA Vessel Salvage Company, the task of safe removal of all diesel, hydrocarbons and marine pollutants on board the vessel, and making the hull watertight was awarded to a Cypriot marine salvage company. This was completed in October 2013. Due to the danger involved, nobody is allowed on the ship.

Peyia Municipality which is the regional administrative authority where Edro III resides has mentioned that there were several studies and attempts to tow the shipwreck, all of which were abandoned due to the difficulty of the project. There are officially no current plans for its removal.

Nearby shipwrecks 
There is another shipwreck nearby.  The wrecked M/V Demetrios II is located near the Tombs of the Kings archaeological site.

References

External links
 Google Maps location

Maritime incidents in 2011
Shipwrecks in the Mediterranean Sea
1966 ships